The Australian Ice Hockey League All-Star Weekend is an annual event showcasing the best talent from the AIHL in skills tests and an exhibition 'All-Stars' match.

History

4 August 2015, the Australian Ice Hockey League (AIHL) announced the formation of a new event in the Australian ice hockey calendar, the AIHL All-Stars Weekend. The event occurs two weeks following the conclusion of the AIHL Finals Weekend.

The maiden Australian Ice Hockey League All-Star Weekend, took place between 12 and 13 September 2015 at Hunter Ice Skating Stadium in Newcastle, NSW.

Cash prizes are on offer for players for the breakaway challenge during the skills tests, the winner of the Most Valuable Player (MVP) in the All-Stars match and the team the MVP comes from. In 2015 the winner of the Breakaway Challenge received $1000, the winner of the MVP received $5000 and the MVP club received $4000.

2015 Rosters
Andrew Petrie and Joey Theriault of the Newcastle North Stars and Vlad Rubes and Ron Kuprowsky of the Sydney Bears were named as the coaching teams for the game.

* Denotes a player not originally selected in either All-Star team but played in the All-Stars match.

Skills competition
The skills competitions selected for presentation by the respective coaches include a number of skills events the National Hockey League showcases at their All-Stars Weekend event. Each event is sponsored by one of the league's major sponsors and are performed on the Saturday afternoon.

Air Canada Fastest Skater competition
In this event, pairs of skaters raced each other simultaneously on parallel courses on the rink. The fastest two skaters then had a final race.

bold = Heat winner
 = Event winner

APA Group Breakaway Challenge
The breakaway challenge saw three shooters and one goalie from each team take to the ice. Each skater was given 3 shots, with full access to the offensive zone, to play out their routine and take a shot. The winner was judged on their presentation as well as scoring by a fan shout off. In goals for Team Bales was Kamil Jarina (SB) and for Team Schlamp Dayne Davis (NNS).

 = Event winner

Haigh and Hastings Shooting Accuracy competition
In this event, competitors were positioned in front of the net, and were passed the puck from two teammates situated behind the goal line. The players had to hit targets at the four corners of the net in the fastest time.

bold = Heat winner
 = Event winner

Rifle Media Stickhandling competition
The stickhanding competition saw two skaters positioned in a head on head contest on identical obstacle courses that would test different styles of stick handling, first one to the finish line wins. There are four skaters in total selected by each team to compete.

bold = Heat winner
 = Event winner

Skaters Network Hardest Shot competition
In this competition, four players from each team skate in from the blue line one at a time, and slap a puck as hard as possible into the net with a speed camera positioned behind the net to register the impact speed. Each player gets two attempts in the heats and the top two players face off in the final and get one attempt to win the event.

bold = Heat winner
 = Event winner

Ryzer Elimination Shootout
In this competition, players attempt to score on the opposing team's goalie. Players who score earn a point for their team for each goal they score. Players are eliminated from the competition if they fail to score.

bold = Goal scorer
 = Event winner

Game summary 
The All-Star game sees a selection of the best players from the AIHL pitted against each other under than banner of two captains. The match is played on the Sunday afternoon.

 Shots on Goal:
 Team Schlamp: 13 – 11 – 10 – Total: 34
 Team Bales: 7 – 11 – 17 – Total: 35

Source: AIHL

Broadcasting
Television: Fox Sports (part of the entire AIHL TV deal with Fox Sports). The AIHL released information that Fox Sports would broadcast the All-Stars Weekend event on their pay-television platform the following Thursday (17 September 2015).

References

External links
AIHL official site
Ice Hockey Australia
Hewitt Sports – AIHL

Australian Ice Hockey League
2015 establishments in Australia
2015 in ice hockey
2015 in Australian sport
Ice hockey all-star games
Recurring sporting events established in 2015
Sport in Newcastle, New South Wales